Sunset Bay is a hamlet and census-designated place (CDP) in the town of Hanover in Chautauqua County, New York, United States. The population was 660 at the 2010 census.

Sunset Bay is adjacent to the Cattaraugus Indian Reservation. On the reservation, adjacent to Sunset Bay, was previously home to a community of approximately 80 non-native residents who leased vacation homes. The Seneca Nation in 2012 declared the longstanding presence of the non-native residents an "illegal occupation" and drove them out of Sunset Bay.

Geography
Sunset Bay is located on the shore of Lake Erie in the northernmost point of the town of Hanover and of Chautauqua County. It is bordered on the northeast by Cattaraugus Creek, which enters Lake Erie just north of an embayment called Sunset Bay. U.S. Route 20 and New York State Route 5 pass through the community as Main Road. Just east of the community is a short connector road from US 20/NY 5 to Exit 58 on the New York State Thruway (Interstate 90).

The nature of Cattaraugus Creek and its volatility leaves the hamlet prone to frequent flooding, especially in the spring.

Demographics

References

Hamlets in New York (state)
Census-designated places in New York (state)
Census-designated places in Chautauqua County, New York
Hamlets in Chautauqua County, New York